Be Up a Hello is the fifteenth studio album by British electronic musician Squarepusher, released through Warp Records on 31 January 2020. It is Tom Jenkinson's first album under the Squarepusher name in five years, following Damogen Furies (2015). The first single, "Vortrack", was released on 6 December 2019. The second single, "Nervelevers", was released on 8 January 2020. A release party was held at the Five Miles nightclub in London on 1 February 2020.

Background
On the album, Jenkinson decided to reuse analogue synthesizers that he used in the early 1990s rather than his own technology that he developed and used on albums like Ufabulum (2012) and Damogen Furies (2015). Jenkinson also made use of vintage effects units and a VIC-20.

Critical reception

Be Up a Hello received generally favourable reviews from critics. At Metacritic, which assigns a normalized rating out of 100 to reviews from professional publications, the album received an average score of 76, based on 14 reviews, indicating 'generally favourable reviews'.

Track listing

Charts

References

2020 albums
Squarepusher albums
Warp (record label) albums